The 2021–22 Norwegian Football Cup was the 115th season of the Norwegian annual knock-out football tournament. The first round was played on 24 and 25 July 2021 and the tournament ended with the final being held on 1 May 2022. Due to delays at the beginning of the season the first round was moved from April to July, resulting in not being able to finish the tournament in 2021. Three rounds were played in 2021, while the remaining four rounds were played at the beginning of the 2022 season.

Calendar
Below are the dates for each round as given by the official schedule:

Source:

First round
The draw for the first round was made on 25 June 2021.

Second round
The draw for the second round was made on 26 July 2021.

Third round
The draw for the third round was made on 5 August 2021. All the matches were played on 22 September 2021.

Fourth round
The draw for the fourth round was made on 22 September 2021. All the matches were set to be played on 12 and 13 March 2022. However, on 2 March, the match between Aalesund and Bodø/Glimt was moved from 13 March to 6 March due to Bodø/Glimt's participation in the 2021–22 UEFA Europa Conference League round of 16. On 4 March, the match was cancelled because Aalesund did not have enough players available on the new date.

Quarter-finals
The draw for the quarter-finals was made on 27 January 2022. The matches were played on 19 and 20 March 2022.

Semi-finals
The draw for the semi-finals was made on 20 March 2022. The matches were played on 6 and 21 April 2022.

Final

The final was played on 1 May 2022.

Top scorers

Notes

References

Norwegian Football Cup seasons
Norwegian Football Cup
Football Cup
Football Cup